The bleeding toad, fire toad, or Indonesia tree toad (Leptophryne cruentata) is a species of "true toad", family Bufonidae, endemic to Java, Indonesia. Leptophryne javanica was included in this species prior its description as a distinct species in 2018, although the degree of differentiation between these species is low. The Bleeding toad is listed as a critically endangered species due to a drastic population decline. The reasons of this decline are unclear, but the decline is consistent with chytridiomycosis, despite ambiguous identification.

Description 
Bleeding toads are medium-sized toads that have dark red/purple bodies with blood-red to yellow marbling present on the back and legs. Males measure  and females  in snout–vent length. They resemble other toads in the family Bufonidae with several distinctions.  They have reduced Bidder's organs, and partially fused pectoral epicoracoid cartilage.  In addition, they have a slender habitus and elongate limbs. They received the common name "bleeding toad" due to the red back markings and the skin secretions they produce when stressed.

Distribution 
Bleeding toads are endemic to western Java and are known from a small number of sites in the Mount Gede Pangrango National Park and from around Mount Halimun Salak National Park. They breed and lay their eggs in slow moving, vernal streams in which the larvae develop.

Threats 
Bleeding toads are listed as critically endangered by the IUCN: once locally abundant, it has declined dramatically and the remaining population is estimated to be no more than 250 adults. It was initially believed that the eruption of Mount Galunggung in 1987 was responsible for a significant portion of this decline due to the loss and degradation of habitat, but at present the decline looks more consistent with chytridiomycosis, as the observed patterns of decline resemble declines of other mountainous stream-breeding amphibians that have been affected by the fungus, but no positive identification of the disease on a bleeding toad has been made. In addition, tourist activities are threatening at least one subpopulation.

The effects of global climate change may also contribute to the decline of the species. As temperatures rise, the range of suitable habitat for many mountainous species is moved to higher elevations.  The result of this is a smaller total amount of suitable habitat, that can support smaller populations.  Additionally, these populations are often isolated, which can leave them vulnerable to events such as the eruption of Mount Galungung.

References 

Leptophryne
Amphibians of Indonesia
Endemic fauna of Java
Amphibians described in 1838
Taxa named by Johann Jakob von Tschudi